Phymaturus is a genus of iguanian lizards of the family Liolaemidae, a family which was traditionally included in the Iguanidae as a subfamily, but more recently was proposed to warrant family status in the Liolaemidae. Phymaturus is the mid-sized genus of its family, with 50 species altogether known as of 2021; new species are still being discovered, however.

Species of the genus Phymaturus are found in the Andes region south to Patagonia and inhabit a variety of habitats. Their habits are mostly conserved from the ancestral iguanians, in that Phymaturus are generally inhabitants of rocky ground, feed on plants, and give birth to fully developed young.

Systematics
The genus can be divided into two lineages, which probably represent clades:

palluma group
Superciliar scales not imbricate, more than four subocular scales, 3-4 rows of lorilabial scales, mental scale narrower than rostral scale and usually touching the sublabial scales. Tail spines well-developed, two annuli per segment.

patagonicus'' group
Superciliar scales elongate and overlapping, one usually unfragmented subocular scale, tail smooth, Meckel's groove fused and closed.

More species which may or may not belong to the aforementioned species groups:Nota bene: A binomial authority in parentheses indicates that the species was originally described in a genus other than Phymaturus.

Footnotes

References
 (2011). "Two new mountain lizard species of the Phymaturus genus (Squamata: Iguania) from northwestern Patagonia, Argentina". Zootaxa 2924: 1-21. (in English with Spanish abstract). PDF abstract.
 (1838). "Beiträge zur genaueren Kenntniss einiger Eidechsgattungen ". Nova Acta Academiae Caesareae Leopoldino-Carolinae 18: 712-784 + Plates LIV-LVI. (Phymaturus, new genus, pp. 749–750). (in German).
 (2008). "When starvation challenges the tradition of niche conservatism: On a new species of the saxicolous genus Phymaturus from Patagonia Argentina with pseudoarboreal foraging behaviour (Iguania, Liolaemidae)". Zootaxa'' 1786: 48-60. (in English with Spanish abstract). PDF abstract.

 
Lizard genera
Lizards of South America
Taxa named by Johann Ludwig Christian Gravenhorst